The Moroccan Open was a professional golf tournament on the European Tour which was first held in 1987. Having been cancelled in 1988, it returned to the schedule in 1992 and was held annually until 2001. This was the second European Tour event in North Africa after the Tunisian Open, but the tour eventually left North Africa to focus its global expansion on the established golf markets of South Africa and Australasia and the major growth region of Asia.

There were several different host courses for the Moroccan Open. In 2001, the prize fund was €651,337, which was one of the smallest on the tour that year.

Winners

References

External links
Coverage on the European Tour's official site

Former European Tour events
Golf tournaments in Morocco
Defunct sports competitions in Morocco